Rainer Willfeld is a German professional football manager.

Career

He was in control of the Burkina Faso national under 17 team during the 2009 FIFA U-17 World Cup.

Between April 2014 and February 2015 he was the head coach of the Burundi national football team.

References

1945 births
Living people
German football managers
Expatriate football managers in Burundi
Burundi national football team managers
Place of birth missing (living people)